The 2012–13 Pittsburgh Panthers men's basketball team represented the University of Pittsburgh, widely known as "Pitt", in the 2012–13 NCAA Division I men's basketball season. The Panthers' head coach was Jamie Dixon, in his 10th year as head coach and 14th overall at Pitt. The team played its home games in the Petersen Events Center in Pittsburgh and was in its final season as a member of the Big East Conference. Pitt played in the ACC the following season. They finished the conference season with 12–6 in the Big East Conference, which they placed 4th. In the postseason, they lost to Syracuse in the quarterfinals of the 2013 Big East men's basketball tournament and lost in the first round of 2013 NCAA tournament to Wichita State to conclude the season with an overall record of 24–9.

Roster

Schedule 
Pitt's 2012–13 schedule.

|-
!colspan=12 style="background:#091C44; color:#CEC499;" | Scrimmage

|-
!colspan=12 style="background:#091C44; color:#CEC499;" | Exhibition

|-
!colspan=12 style="background:#091C44; color:#CEC499;" | Regular season

|-
!colspan=9 style="background:#091C44; color:#CEC499;" |Postseason†2013 Big East men's basketball tournament

|-
!colspan=9 style="background:#091C44; color:#CEC499;" | NCAA Division I Men's Basketball Championship

Rankings

Postseason
Pitt was announced as one of the four eight seed in the 2013 NCAA Division I men's basketball tournament on Sunday, March 17, 2013.  They played in the West Region.  Their first game was against nine seed Wichita State University on Thursday, March 21, in Salt Lake City at 1:40 in the afternoon. They lost with a final score of 73 to 55.

References

Pittsburgh Panthers
Pittsburgh Panthers men's basketball seasons
Pittsburgh
Pittsburgh Pan
Pittsburgh Pan